Anna Panayiotopoulou (born 30 July 1947) is a famous Greek actress that has starred in many series, films and theatrical plays.

She became famous after starring in the Greek series Madam Sousou in 1986.

A major hit of her career was starring as one of the three Haritou sisters, Olga, in the Greek hit series Oi Treis Harites during 1990-92. In 1993 she wrote and starred in the series Rosalia (with Eleni Gerasimidou). The series lasted only 1 season due to low ratings. In 1995, she starred in another successful series Ntoltse Vita as Christina Markatou. The series draw high ratings and lasted 2 seasons.

Panayiotopoulou also enjoyed a successful film career, having appeared in several commercially and critically successful films such as Safe Sex (1999) and To Klama Vgike Apo ton Paradiso (Crying... Silicon Tears) (2001).

Filmography

References

External links

Living people
Actresses from Athens
1947 births
Greek actresses